The Elephant's Journey is a novel by Nobel Prize-winning author José Saramago. It was first published in 2008 with an English translation in 2010.

Plot

In 1551, King João III of Portugal gave Archduke Maximilian an unusual wedding present: an elephant named Solomon or Suleiman.  This elephant's journey from Lisbon to Vienna was witnessed and remarked upon by scholars, historians, and ordinary people.  Out of this material, José Saramago has spun a novel already heralded as "a triumph of language, imagination, and humor" (El País).

Solomon and his keeper, Subhro, begin in dismal conditions, forgotten in a corner of the palace grounds.  When it occurs to the king and queen that an elephant would be an appropriate wedding gift, everyone rushes to get them ready: Subhro is given two new suits of clothes and Solomon a long overdue scrub.  They cross the border into Spain at Castelo Rodrigo and meet the Archduke at Valladolid.

Accompanied by the Archduke, his new wife, the royal guard, Soloman and Subhro cross a continent riven by the Reformation and civil wars.  They make their way through the storied cities of northern Italy: Genoa, Piacenza, Mantua, Verona, Venice, and Trento, where the Council of Trent is in session.  They brave the Alps and the terrifying Isarco and Brenner Passes; they sail from Rosas across the Mediterranean Sea and later up the Inn River (elephants, it turns out, are natural sailors).  At last they make their grand entry into the imperial city.  The Elephant's Journey is a tale of friendship and adventure.

Topics 
Saramago shows the sentimental side of all people and animals, regardless of their social status. The characters are thus full of different nuances, such as the ignorance of kings, the convenient flexibility of a cleric in the middle of the night, the intelligence of a mahout to sell elephant hair to alleviate any evil.

Editions
The novel was translated into English by Margaret Jull Costa and published in 2010.

Awards and recognitions
2009 São Paulo Prize for Literature — Shortlisted in the Best Book of the Year category (Portuguese original)
2011 Oxford-Weidenfeld Translation Prize — Winner (English translation).

References

Novels by José Saramago
2008 novels
21st-century Portuguese novels
Lisbon in fiction
Books about elephants
Novels set in Spain
Novels set in Italy
Novels set in Vienna
Novels set in the 1550s
Maximilian II, Holy Roman Emperor